Edward Bayles Simpson (November 21, 1835 – January 12, 1915) was a member of the Wisconsin State Assembly and the Wisconsin State Senate. He was born in Canada West, and settled in Princeton, Wisconsin in 1849 and Milwaukee, Wisconsin in 1861, where he was involved in the lumber business. Simpson was a member of the Assembly in 1879 and 1880. He had previously been an unsuccessful candidate for the Assembly twice. In 1881 and 1882, Simpson represented the 7th District in the Senate. Other positions he held include Town Clerk, Assessor and Treasurer of Princeton. He was a Republican.

References

External links

Pre-Confederation Ontario people
Politicians from Milwaukee
People from Green Lake County, Wisconsin
Republican Party Wisconsin state senators
Republican Party members of the Wisconsin State Assembly
City and town treasurers in the United States
City and town clerks
1835 births
1915 deaths